Norman Maurice Armitage (born 13 June 1945) is a Colombian businessman, politician, and philanthropist who served as the mayor of Cali, the third-largest city in Colombia, and the economic hub of Southwestern Colombia from 2016 to 2019.

Education and early career
Armitage studied Law at University, and then went to work in steel mining. He bought his first company SIDOC (Siderúrgica de Occidente) which he still owns. Armitage also owns the Ingenio de Ocidente which is an Agribusiness company whose main product is refined sugar and owns 3,000 hectares of land which is used for production. Armitage is also a shareholder of Cementos San Marcos, and is a part of the board of directors of the Cali Chamber of Commerce and Fenalco Valle.

Social Work 
Armitage is well known for his philanthropy and social work in the suburbs such as Siloé.  He is a firm believer in the peace process to end the armed conflict in Colombia and previously volunteered to put his foundation to use to help destroy the weapons when the (M19) demobilised. All of the companies owned by Armitage split a share of the profits with their employees every 3 months, and he also advocates paying more than the standard minimum wage to his workers.

Mayor of Cali (2016-2019)

Peace in Colombia
Due to his past experiences, including when he was kidnapped, Armitage became more involved in charitable causes and organizations which sought to bring peace to Colombia.  Subsequently when President Juan Manuel Santos announced to the world and the Colombian people that he was holding peace talks with the FARC in Havana, Cuba, Maurice Armitage then formed part of a group of victims who travelled to Havana to take part in the peace talks and help the Government.

Personal life
Armitage is married to Patricia Tello Dorronsoro and they have two daughters. Armitage's father was English, and his mother was from Antioquia.Armitage was a cousins of former Colombian senator and politician, Esmeralda Arboleda Cadavid as well as Arboleda's sister, Mireya Arboleda, a classical pianist.

References

1945 births
Living people
Mayors of Cali
University of Valle
Colombian philanthropists
Colombian people of English descent